Clanculus santamariae is a species of sea snail, a marine gastropod mollusk in the family Trochidae, the top snails.

Description

Distribution
This species occurs in the Atlantic Ocean off Angola.

References

 Gofas, S.; Afonso, J.P.; Brandào, M. (Ed.). (S.a.). Conchas e Moluscos de Angola = Coquillages et Mollusques d'Angola. [Shells and molluscs of Angola]. Universidade Agostinho / Elf Aquitaine Angola: Angola. 140 pp.

Endemic fauna of Angola
santamariae
Gastropods described in 1984